The University of Florida's (UF) online pharmaceutical chemistry distance education programs cater to working professionals and students who have completed their Bachelor of Science degrees.

Each course within UF’s program is conducted online and is made up of specific topic modules. Most modules contain course notes supplemented with images, animations, and case studies. Students are provided constant access to course modules, which are released over the duration of the UF semester.

Degree and certificate programs currently offered

UF currently offers one Master of Science (MS) program, one Professional Science Master's (PSM), and one graduate certificate in pharmaceutical chemistry.

Degree programs

 MS in Pharmaceutical Chemistry
 PSM (Professional Science Master's) in Pharmaceutical Chemistry

Certificate programs

 Pharmaceutical Chemistry

Degree programs

Master of Science in Pharmaceutical Chemistry
The pharmaceutical chemistry master's degree program consists of 32 credits offered entirely online with the exception of a three-day final cumulative examination held on campus.

Professional Science Master's in Pharmaceutical Chemistry
The Professional Science master's degree is offered as a cooperative effort between UF's College of Pharmacy and Webber International University's Graduate School of Business. It consists of 36 credits, 27 credits focused on the technical pharmaceutical chemistry content from UF and 9 credits focused on the professional business content from Webber International University.

Certificate programs

Pharmaceutical Chemistry
The certificate in pharmaceutical chemistry is provided by the UF College of Pharmacy. It consists of 15 credits offered entirely online.

Elective courses
The UF pharmaceutical chemistry program offers four elective courses that are administered entirely online. These courses focus on specialty areas of healthcare-related issues and are intended to provide pharmacy students, pharmacists, medical doctors, nurses, and other healthcare professionals with applicable knowledge that can be used in a variety of work environments such as retail pharmacies, hospitals, or poison control centers.

The following courses are offered:

 Veterinary Pharmacy
 Herbal & Dietary Supplements
 Introduction to Clinical Toxicology
 Clinical Toxicology 1

Recognitions

 Program director Dr. Ian Tebbett, Ph.D., was awarded the Irving Award by American Distance Education Consortium (ADEC) in 2011 and the 2010 Outstanding Leadership Award by the U.S. Distance Learning Association.

About the University of Florida

 The University of Florida is the fourth largest academic institution in the US. It is accredited by both the Southern Association of Colleges and Schools (SACS) and the Association of American Universities (AAU).
 UF enrolls more than 6,500 distance students and has more than 330,000 alumni throughout the world.

See also

 University of Florida: Forensic Science Distance Education Programs
 University of Florida clinical toxicology distance education program

References

External links
 UF Pharmaceutical Chemistry Online Graduate Program – University of Florida pharmaceutical chemistry website.
 PharMore Info Newsletter – Official newsletter of the UF pharmaceutical chemistry program.
 UF Distance Learning – University of Florida distance learning website.
 University of Florida – Official website of the University of Florida.

University of Florida
Distance education institutions based in the United States
2009 establishments in Florida